The Bronze Baby trophy is awarded to the winning team of the U Sports women's basketball championship, contested among competing Canadian universities. The trophy features a figure that is a replica of a statue that was in the grounds of Dunfermline College of Physical Education in Scotland. The trophy was first donated in 1922 by the Students' Council of McGill University and awarded to the Ontario and Quebec conference champion of the Women's Interuniversity Athletic Union (WIAU). After the WIAU amalgamated with the Ontario Women's Interuniversity Athletic Union (OWIAA) in 1971, the trophy was retired and returned to McGill. The trophy was then offered to the Canadian Women's Interuniversity Athletic Union (CWIAU) in 1972 to be competed for at a fully national level. The CWIAU merged with the Canadian Interuniversity Athletic Union (CIAU), the men's union, in 1978 and awarded by the now-named U Sports governing body.

The 2021 championship tournaments were cancelled due to the COVID-19 pandemic.

Format

The championship currently consists of an eight-team tournament, with champions from each of the four conferences, one host, an additional OUA team, an additional Canada West team and one at-large berth. The tournament was originally composed of just four qualifying teams from 1972 to 1976 until it was expanded to include six in 1977. The championship was then changed to include eight teams in 1979 and has generally remained the same since then. In the 2011 edition, the then-named CIS had West, Central, and East regional play-in games to determine the three remaining spot in the tournament (the other five went to the four conference champions and host). In 2012, there were East and West regional games to determine two additional berths and by 2013 the league had reverted to voting in the three remaining spots. Aside from those two years of regional qualifiers, the tournament has always taken place over one weekend at a pre-determined host site.

Results

Championship game appearances

A. The Simon Fraser Clan were members of the CIS (now U Sports) from 2001 to 2010.

See also 
 Timeline of women's basketball

External links
U Sports Women's Final 8

References

U Sports trophies
College basketball competitions
U Sports Women's Basketball Championship
U Sports women's basketball